The Fredericks House in Prescott, Arizona was built during 1902–03.  It was listed on the National Register of Historic Places in 1978.

It is a "stylistically ambiguous" one-and-a-half-story house built for banker and capitalist R.N. Fredericks.  He served as president of the Prescott National Bank and had extensive personal investments.  As of 2020, the home serves as the home of the Earnest A. Love American Legion Post No. 6.

References

Houses on the National Register of Historic Places in Arizona
Houses completed in 1902
Houses in Yavapai County, Arizona
Buildings and structures in Prescott, Arizona
1902 establishments in Arizona Territory
National Register of Historic Places in Prescott, Arizona